Hou Yanqi (March 1970) is a Chinese diplomat who is serving as the  Ambassador to ASEAN. From 2018 to 2022 she served as the Ambassador to Nepal.

Biography 
Hou was born in Qingxu County, Taiyuan, Shanxi province, China in 1970.

Career 
Hou has served at the Ministry of Foreign Affairs since 1996, prior to being appointed ambassador, she was the deputy director general, focusing on South Asian affairs. She has also been stationed in Pakistan and as the consul of the Chinese Consulate-General in Los Angeles. From 2018 to 2022 she served as Ambassador to Nepal. On 22 December 2022 she was sworn in as Ambassador to ASEAN.

She has been noted for her use of Twitter to increase the soft power of China.

Personal life
Hou is married and has one son. She speaks Urdu, which she majored at Peking University.

See also
 China-Nepal relations

References 

Living people
1970 births
Ambassadors of China to Nepal
Chinese diplomats
Peking University alumni
People from Taiyuan